Kuncl is a surname. Notable people with the surname include:

Martin Kuncl (born 1984), Czech footballer
Ralph Kuncl, American neurologist and academic